Cheongdam Bridge is a bridge over the Han River in Seoul, South Korea. It is the 18th bridge to be constructed over the river. The bridge links the Gwangjin and Gangnam districts. It carries a section of Line 7 of the Seoul Subway, between Cheongdam Station and Ttukseom Resort Station, on its underside, making it the first "duplex bridge" in South Korea. The road portion is a part of the Dongbu Expressway, which limits the bridge to motor traffic only.

References

Bridges in Seoul
Bridges completed in 2001
Bridges over the Han River (Korea)
Rapid transit bridges
Road-rail bridges
Seoul Subway Line 7